Triscari is a surname of Italian origin. Notable people with the surname include:

Gemma Triscari (born 1990), Australian cricketer
John Triscari (born 1957), Australian basketball coach

References

Surnames of Italian origin